Khaduli Barlas or, Khadjuli Barlas (Mongol: Хадули Барлас ; died 12th Century AD.) was the Borjigin Prince. He was the son of Tumbinai Khan and brother of the Khabul Khan who was the founder of Khamag Mongol. They lived in the 12th century. Historians mentioned him as ''full-brother'' of the Khabul Khan, He served Khamag Mongol as a military leader, minister and advisor. (11301148) He was the paternal ancestor of Timur through his great-great-great-grandson Qarachar Barlas (11661256) founder of the Barlas Mongol clan. He fought along with his brother Qabul Khan against China. They won victories for Khamag Mongol confederacy, His son Erumduli Barlas also served the Mongol administration.
Tengrists People
Sons of monarchs

References 

12th-century Mongolian people
Borjigin